In 1991, the government of the United States said it had unearthed details of the alleged construction of a nuclear reactor in Algeria. The Washington Times accused the country of developing nuclear weapons with the help of the Chinese government. The Algerian government admitted it was building a reactor, but denied any secrecy or military purpose. Surveillance from U.S. satellites also suggested that the reactor would not be used for military purposes. China had secretly made an agreement in 1983 to assist Algeria in developing a nuclear reactor.

In November 1991, succumbing to international pressure, Algeria placed the reactor under IAEA safeguards. Algeria signed the Nuclear Non-Proliferation Treaty in January 1995, and ratified the Chemical Weapons Convention In August 2001, Algeria acceded to the Biological Weapons Convention. Algeria signed the Treaty on the Prohibition of Nuclear Weapons on 20 September 2017, but has not ratified it .

Notes and references

References 
 Ref. 
 http://www.atomicarchive.com/Almanac/Testing.shtml

Politics of Algeria
Weapons of mass destruction by country